Commission v Italy (2009) C-110/05 is an EU law case, concerning the free movement of goods in the European Union. This case is commonly referred to as 'Italian Trailers', and is predominantly known for establishing the 'market access test'.

Facts
Italian law prohibited motorcycles and mopeds from pulling trailers (that is, it regulated the use of a product). It applied without regard to the origin of the trailers, but it only affected imported goods in fact. Italian manufacturers did not make such trailers to be towed by motorcycles. The Commission challenged the Italian law as being contrary to TFEU article 34.

Judgment

Advocate General Bot
AG Bot argued that this should be considered a measure equivalent to a quantitative restriction on trade, that required justification.

Court of Justice
Court of Justice held that a measure hindering market access would be considered a measure equivalent to a quantitative restriction on trade, but that it could be justified on the facts.

Criticism and development of the Italian Trailers jurisprudence 
The market access test, established in this case, has been criticised for lack of clarity due to the Court having never defined 'market access'. Italian Trailers held that laying down requirements to be met by goods can constitute measures having equivalent effect to quantitative restrictions if they present an obstacle to their free movement, even if those rules apply to all products alike, demonstrating an excessively broad scope for what will constitute a measure equaling equivalent effect to a quantitative restriction.

This test has, however, been the most preferred approach, having overridden the discrimination test introduced by Keck and Mithouard, and attracted wide-spread academic support for replacing all three tests adopted since Keck with a unitary market access test. The recent case of Ker-Optika evidenced a case regarding selling arrangements being decided using a market access test rather than the discrimination test outlined in Keck, demonstrating how the courts may already be taking this approach.

See also

European Union law

References

European Union goods case law
2009 in case law
Trailers
Motorcycling in Italy
2009 in Italy